Afrodisiac may refer to:

Afrodisiac (Fela Kuti album), 1971
Afrodisiac (The Main Ingredient album), 1973
Afrodisiac (comics), a Marvel Comics character
Afrodisiac (Brandy album), 2004
Afrodisiac, album by Rastine, 1992
Afro-Disiac, album by Willy Chirino, 2001
"Afrodisiac", a 1995 song by Powder
"Afrodisiac" (song), a 2004 song by Brandy

See also
Aphrodisiac (disambiguation)